This is a list of members of the 20th Legislative Assembly of Queensland from 1915 to 1918, as elected at the 1915 state election held on 22 May 1915.

The election was a landslide for the Labor Party, with the previous premier Digby Denham and many of the Denham Ministry losing their parliamentary seats.

The members elected with the support of the Queensland Farmers' Union organised as the Country Party.

Unlike in most other states at this time, the Labor Party in Queensland did not split over the conscription issue; however, the former Liberal and Country members largely joined the National Party.

 On 10 July 1915, William Hamilton, the Labor member for Gregory, was appointed to the Queensland Legislative Council. Labor candidate George Pollock was elected unopposed at the resulting by-election on 18 August 1915.
 On 25 February 1916, David Bowman, the Labor member for Fortitude Valley, died. Labor candidate Thomas Wilson won the resulting by-election on 1 April 1916.
 On 15 February 1917, Alfred Jones, the Labor member for Maryborough, was appointed to the Legislative Council. Labor candidate David Weir won the resulting by-election on 31 March 1917.
 John Adamson, the member for Rockhampton, left the Labor Party in 1916 and from then on, sat as an Independent. On 21 March 1917, he resigned to contest an Australian Senate seat for Queensland at the 1917 federal election as an Independent Nationalist. Labor candidate Frank Forde won the resulting by-election on 12 May 1917.
 On 29 December 1917, John May, the Labor member for Flinders, died. No by-election was held due to the proximity of the 1918 state election.

References

 Waterson, Duncan Bruce: Biographical Register of the Queensland Parliament 1860-1929 (second edition), Sydney 2001.

See also
1915 Queensland state election
Ryan Ministry (Labor) (1915–1919)

Members of Queensland parliaments by term
20th-century Australian politicians